FLD may refer to: Hurst's Future Line of Demarcation

Politics 
 Federalists and Liberal Democrats, a former political party in Italy
 Front for the Liberation of Djibouti
 Liberal Democratic Foundation, a former political party in Italy

Places
 Fauldhouse railway station (rail station code: FLD), in Scotland, UK
 Fond du Lac County Airport (IATA airport code: FLD; ICAO airport code: KFLD), in Wisconsin, USA
 Fld. (Field), a street suffix

Medicine
 Farmer's lung disease
 Fatty liver disease
 Fazio–Londe disease

Other uses 
 Fast Lane Daily, a video podcast
 Ferroelectric liquid crystal display
 Fisher's linear discriminant, a method used in statistics
 Forming limit diagram, a diagram used in material science and metallurgy to predict sheet-forming behavior
 Free Lunch Design, a Swedish videogame developer, a subsidiary of Palringo

See also

 FLDS
 Field (disambiguation)
 Fluid (disambiguation)